This is a list of episodes from the thirteenth season of Shark Tank. The season premiered on October 8, 2021, on ABC.

Episodes

Guest sharks this season include Emma Grede, CEO and co-founder of Good American and founding partner of Skims; actor and comedian Kevin Hart; Peter Jones, dragon on Dragons' Den; Daniel Lubetzky, founder and executive chairman of Kind; and Nirav Tolia, co-founder of Nextdoor.

References

External links 
 Official website
 

13
2021 American television seasons
2022 American television seasons